Without You I'm Nothing is the second record released by comedian and singer Sandra Bernhard.

History
It was released at the height of her career and is a live performance recording that was issued on double-cassette, compact disc and double-vinyl in 1989; it was later re-released on double-compact disc and made available for sale on Bernhard's own website. The re-release included a second disc of bonus material.

Material
Bernhard developed the show with Mitch Kaplan, her musical director, and John Boscovich who co-wrote and directed.  In an interview, she was quoted as saying “Almost every night, we went out afterwards, dancing, or hung out on Second Avenue. There were a lot more people on the street. It was just a more accessible, affordable situation back then.” 

The recording features a combination of live music performance and comedy. The recording contains material from Bernhard's one-woman show of the same name, whose motion picture adaptation would arrive three years later.

Track listing
"The Commitment"
"Childhood Reminiscences"
"White Christmas"
"Time of the Season"
"Me & Mrs. Jones"
"The Woman I Could Have Been"
"Mighty Real"
"The Women of Rock 'N' Roll"
"Ain't No Mountain High Enough"
"Apocalyptic White Trash"
"Finale: The Lion Sleeps Tonight"
"Encore: Little Red Corvette"

Bonus Tracks on Re-Release Disc 2
"Undressed"
"Is That All There Is?"
""Until the Real Thing Comes Along"
"Mighty Real" (Slow Remix)
"Mighty Real" (Special Remix)
"Mighty Real" (Her Remix)
"Mighty Real" (The Remix)
"Mighty Real" (Rapid Remix)

Personnel
Sandra Bernhard – lead singer & spoken-word
Mitch Kaplan – acoustic piano
Tori Amos – background vocals ("Little Red Corvette")
Nancy Shanks - background vocals ("Little Red Corvette")
Tim Landers – bass
John S. Boskovich

References

External links
Sandra Bernhard official website

Sandra Bernhard albums
1987 live albums
1980s comedy albums
Albums produced by Joe Chiccarelli